These are the Hong Kong Island results of the 2016 Hong Kong Legislative Council election. The election was held on 4 September 2016 and all 6 seats in Hong Kong Island were contested, one lesser than 2012. The pro-Beijing camp and the anti-establishment camp split evenly by winning three seats each, with 23-year-old post-Occupy student leader Nathan Law of Demosisto became the youngest ever elected candidate. Tanya Chan returned to the Legislative Council by securing the last seat over non-partisan businessmen Ricky Wong.

Overall results

Before election:

Change in composition:

Candidates list

Opinion polling

See also
Legislative Council of Hong Kong
Hong Kong legislative elections
2016 Hong Kong legislative election

References

2016 Hong Kong legislative election